INTERSOS is a non-profit humanitarian aid organization that works to assist victims of natural disaster and armed conflict. INTERSOS has operated as an independent organization since its foundation in 1992. A Mine Action Unit was established within INTERSOS to deal specifically with the mine danger and its effects through mine awareness, victims assistance and mine clearance operations.

INTERSOS is recognized by the Italian Ministry for Foreign Affairs, the European Commission and the principal UN agencies; it holds an advisory status with the United Nations Economic and Social Council (ECOSOC).

Current Activities
Providing emergency relief in crisis situations to civilian populations through the distribution of food and basic needs items, water, health, protection and the safeguarding of human rights, with particular attention paid to more vulnerable groups.
Assisting refugees and internally displaced persons: organization and management of refugee camps and reception centers.
Supporting the return of refugees and displaced persons. Assisting in the reconstruction of housing and community services, the restarting of economic activities and the democratic process. Fostering the growth of local potential and training courses.
The functional rehabilitation of social structures and public services: hospitals, treatment centers, schools, wells and aqueducts, housing.
Humanitarian mine clearance activities: the clearance of lands contaminated with mines, cluster bombs and other unexploded devices; Mine Risk Education concerning the dangers posed by landmines and other unexploded devices; the physical rehabilitation of landmine victims
Promoting the resumption of dialogue, peace and reconciliation.

Countries of Operation
Bolded countries indicate programs that are currently in operation

AFRICA: Angola, Burkina Faso, Burundi, Cameroon, Chad, Central African Republic, Democratic Republic of The Congo, Eritrea, Ethiopia, Kenya, Liberia, Libya, Mauritania, Mozambique, Nigeria, Niger, Rwanda, Somalia, Sudan, South Sudan

CENTRAL AMERICA: El Salvador, Honduras, Nicaragua, Haiti, Venezuela

ASIA AND THE MIDDLE EAST: Afghanistan, Bangladesh, India, Indonesia, Iran, Iraq, Jordan, Lebanon, Pakistan, Syria, Sri Lanka, Yemen

EUROPE: Albania, Bosnia-Herzegovina, Chechnya (Russian Federation), Italy, Greece, Kosovo, Republic of Macedonia, Montenegro, Poland, Serbia.

Funding

Part of INTERSOS's funding comes from its own members and from donations made by individuals, associations, social organisations, solidarity groups and businesses. Most of its funding comes from various public bodies: the European Union, ECHO (the Humanitarian Office of the European Commission), the Italian Government and other International Governments, FAO, OCHA, UNDP, UNHCR, UNICEF, UNMAS, UNOPS, WFP, WHO, Italian Regions, Provinces and City Councils. The Italian Federation of Trade Unions has been a constant supporter of INTERSOS. 
AUSER is also a supporter of INTERSOS.

The budget, which amounted to approximately 82 million Euros a year (€82.121.587, total revenues of 2020), is certified by a leading public auditing firm.

Networks and Affiliations

LINK 2007 A network of 12 Italian NGOs that promotes lobbying and advocacy initiatives. Together they undertake campaigns for the purpose of improving and extending operational opportunities, and the quality and importance of development cooperation; strengthening the knowledge, values and specific expertise of the NGOs involved.
AGIRE (Italian Emergency Response Agency) is a coordination of twelve of the most influential and accredited Italian non-governmental organisations which have chosen to unite their efforts to intervene in a timely manner on serious humanitarian emergencies. It is a permanent forum that groups together Italian non-profit organisations dedicated to social action.
CONCORD European NGO Confederation for relief and development (represented by the Italian NGOs).

References 

Emergency organizations